is 2011 Japanese television drama starring Yūji Oda who reprised his role as Kosaku Kuroda in this sequel to Amalfi: Rewards of the Goddess (2009) with a 
supporting cast led by Kou Shibasaki and Kaho. South Korean actor Lee Byung-hun made a cameo as Kuroda's lawyer and childhood friend John.

Cast
Yūji Oda as Kosaku Kuroda
Kou Shibasaki as Rikako Ogaki
Kaho as Rui Shimomura
Kei Tanaka as Mori Saionji
Takahiro Nishijima as Yutaro Kimishima
Masaomi Kondō as Shoosuke Saitou
Lee Byung-hun as John
Takeshi Kaga as Yosuke Ando
Ryo Iwamatsu as Takeshikeru Yamazi
Mahiru Konno as Tomoyo Shimomura
Jun Miho as Kyouko Ogaki
Koji Ookura as Yuji Kamosita
Tetsushi Tanaka as Kazuhiko Niida
Nana Katase as Aiko Sasaki
Masato Hagiwara as Kichi Yuki
Tamiyo Kusakari as Shoko Mikami
Teruyuki Kagawa as Takeshi Shimomura

References

External links
Diplomat Kosaku Kuroda at Fuji TV
Kosaku Kuroda official website at Fuji TV

Japanese drama television series
2011 Japanese television series debuts
2011 Japanese television series endings
Fuji TV dramas
Works about diplomats